Tobrilidae is a family of nematodes belonging to the order Triplonchida.

Genera

Genera:
 Asperotobrilus Shoshin, 1991
 Baicalobrilus Tsalolikhin, 1976
 Brevitobrilus Tsalolikhin, 1981

References

Nematodes